The Magnolia Heights Historic District is a U.S. historic district (designated as such on June 29, 1984) located in Tallahassee, Florida. The district runs from 701 through 1005 East Park Avenue, and Cadiz Street. It contains 25 historic buildings.

References

External links

 Leon County listings at National Register of Historic Places

Geography of Tallahassee, Florida
National Register of Historic Places in Tallahassee, Florida
Historic districts on the National Register of Historic Places in Florida